A by-election for the seat of Victoria Park in the Legislative Assembly of Western Australia was held on 10 February 1945. It was triggered by the death of the sitting member, Howard Raphael of the Labor Party, on 9 December 1944. The election was won by an independent candidate, William Read, who finished with 56.7 percent of the two-candidate-preferred vote. Outside of Read's victory, the election was also notable as the first in Western Australia to be contested by the newly established Liberal Party.

Background
Howard Raphael, a prominent dentist and member of the Perth City Council, had held Victoria Park for the Labor Party since the seat's creation at the 1930 state election. He enlisted in a dental unit of the Australian Army in 1942, but continued on as a member of parliament until his sudden death in Sydney in December 1944. After his death, the writ for the by-election was issued on 3 January 1945, with the close of nominations on 19 January. Polling day was on 10 February, with the writ returned on 23 February.

Candidates
Six candidates contested the by-election:
 Joseph Cole, a shopwalker from Victoria Park, stood as an independent.
 James Collins, a builder from Mount Lawley, stood for the Liberal Party.
 Carlyle Ferguson, a journalist from South Perth, stood for the Australian All-Parties League. He was a perennial candidate at both state and federal elections.
 John MacMillan, a pharmacist from Victoria Park, stood as an Independent Labor candidate.
 Harry Martin, a tramway worker from Victoria Park, stood for the Labor Party. He was prominent in the Tramways Union, and won preselection against twelve other candidates.
 William Read, a pharmacist from Victoria Park, stood as an independent. He had served on the Perth City Council since 1926, representing the Victoria Park ward.

Results

Aftermath
Read joined three other independents in the Legislative Assembly – Horace Berry, Lionel Kelly, and Harry Shearn. He was re-elected at the 1947 state election, and with Shearn supported Ross McLarty's efforts to form a minority government.

See also
 List of Western Australian state by-elections

References

Western Australian state by-elections
1945 elections in Australia
February 1945 events in Australia
1940s in Western Australia